Tsang Yi Ming (born 26 March, 1966) is a Hong Kong butterfly, freestyle and medley swimmer. He competed at the 1984 Summer Olympics in Los Angeles and the 1988 Summer Olympics in Seoul.

References

External links
 

1966 births
Living people
Hong Kong male butterfly swimmers
Hong Kong male freestyle swimmers
Hong Kong male medley swimmers
Olympic swimmers of Hong Kong
Swimmers at the 1984 Summer Olympics
Swimmers at the 1988 Summer Olympics
Commonwealth Games competitors for Hong Kong
Swimmers at the 1982 Commonwealth Games
Swimmers at the 1986 Commonwealth Games
Place of birth missing (living people)
Swimmers at the 1982 Asian Games
Swimmers at the 1986 Asian Games
Asian Games competitors for Hong Kong